The Tagula manucode (Manucodia alter) is a species of bird-of-paradise.

Distribution
Endemic to Papua New Guinea, the Tagula manucode is distributed to Tagula Island of the Louisiade Archipelago.

References

 Frith, C. B.; Beehler, B. M. 1998. The birds of paradise. Oxford University Press, Inc., New York
 Sibley, C. G.; Monroe, B. L. 1990. Distribution and taxonomy of birds of the world. Yale University Press, New Haven, USA.

Manucodia
Birds described in 1903
Taxa named by Walter Rothschild
Taxa named by Ernst Hartert